Rosenbach is a surname, and may refer to:
 A. S. W. Rosenbach (1876–1952), American collector, scholar, and seller of rare books and manuscripts
 Eric Rosenbach, American public servant and retired U.S. Army Captain
 Friedrich Julius Rosenbach (1842–1923), German physician and microbiologist
 Helene Rosenbach, Polish American psychoanalyst
 Marcel Rosenbach (born 1972), German journalist
 Ottomar Rosenbach (1851–1907), German physician
 Timm Rosenbach (born 1966), American football player and coach
 Ulrike Rosenbach (born 1943), video artist from Germany

See also 
 Rosenbach (disambiguation)

Jewish surnames